Bismuth germanium oxide or bismuth germanate is an inorganic chemical compound of bismuth, germanium and oxygen. Most commonly the term refers to the compound with chemical formula  (BGO), with the cubic evlitine crystal structure, used as a scintillator.

Bi4Ge3O12
Bi4Ge3O12 has a cubic crystal structure (a = 1.0513 nm, z = 4, Pearson symbol cI76, space group I3d No. 220) and a density of 7.12 g/cm3. When irradiated by X-rays or gamma rays it emits photons of wavelengths between 375 and 650 nm, with peak at 480 nm it produces about 8500 photons per megaelectronvolt of the high energy radiation absorbed. It has good radiation hardness (parameters remaining stable up to 5.104 Gy), high scintillation efficiency, good energy resolution between 5 and 20 MeV, is mechanically strong, and is not hygroscopic. Its melting point is 1050 °C. It is the most common oxide-based scintillator.

Bismuth germanium oxide is used in detectors in particle physics, aerospace physics, nuclear medicine, geology exploration, and other industries. Bismuth germanate arrays are used for gamma pulse spectroscopy. BGO crystals are also used in positron emission tomography detectors.

Commercially available crystals are grown by the Czochralski process and usually supplied in the form of cuboids or cylinders. Large crystals can be obtained. Crystal production is typically done around 1100 °C, i.e. around 50 °C above its melting point.

Bi12GeO20
Bi12GeO20 has a cubic crystal structure (a = 1.01454 nm,  z = 2, Pearson symbol cI66, space group I23 No. 197) and a density of 9.22 g/cm3. This bismuth germanate has high electro-optic coefficients (3.3 pm/V for Bi12GeO20), making it useful in nonlinear optics for building Pockels cells, and can also be used for photorefractive devices for ultraviolet range.

The Bi12GeO20 crystals are piezoelectric, show strong electro-optical and acousto-optical effects, and find limited use in the field of crystal oscillators and surface acoustic wave devices. Single crystal rods and fibers can be grown by floating zone process from a rod of mixture of bismuth oxide and germanium oxide. The crystals are transparent and brown colored.

The crystals of BGO and similar compounds BSO (Bi12SiO20, bismuth silicon oxide, sillenite) and BTO (Bi12TiO20), are photorefractive and photoconductive. BGO and BSO crystals are efficient photoconductors with low dark conductivity. They can be used in electro-optical applications, like optical PROM, PRIZ spatial light modulators, realtime hologram recording, correlators, and systems for adaptive correction of ultrashort laser pulses, and in fiber optic sensors for electric and magnetic fields. Waveguide structures allow uniform illumination over wide spectral range. Thin film sillenite structures, which can be deposited e.g. by sputtering, have wide range of potential applications. BSO crystals are used in optically addressed spatial light modulators and in liquid crystal light valves. The optical activity of BTO is much smaller than of BGO and BSO. Unlike somewhat similar performing perovskites, sillenites aren't ferroelectric.

The materials can find use in phased-array optics.

When sputtering, the target has to be kept below 450 °C as otherwise the bismuth vapor pressure would get the composition out of stoichiometry, but above 400 °C to form the piezoelectric γ phase.

See also 
 Scintillating bolometer
 Germanate

References

External links
 Scintillation crystals

Bismuth compounds
Nonlinear optical materials
Phosphors and scintillators
Crystals
Germanates